Syllepte trifidalis is a moth in the family Crambidae. It is found in South Africa and Yemen.

References

Moths described in 1908
trifidalis
Moths of Africa